Stadion 1000-lecia Państwa Polskiego (English: 1000th-Anniversary of Polish State Stadium) is a multi-use stadium in Zawiercie, Poland. The stadium has a capacity of 1500 people and was opened in 1966.

The stadium is a home for Warta Zawiercie.

See also
List of football stadiums in Poland

References

1000-lecia, Stadium
Zawiercie County
Sports venues in Silesian Voivodeship